"Nu när du gått" ("Now that you left") is a song by Swedish singers Lena Philipsson and Orup (as Lena + Orup) from their collaborative album Dubbel (2008). The song was released as the album's lead single on 22 September 2008 by Roxy and Sony BMG. It peaked at number one on the Sverigetopplistan singles chart.

Chart performance
"Nu när du gått" debuted atop the Sverigetopplistan singles chart on 25 September 2008. It peaked at number one for two non-consecutive weeks and remained on the chart for a total of ten weeks. The song also peaked at number six on the Svensktoppen chart on 26 October 2008.

Track listing
CD single / digital download
"Nu när du gått" – 3:35

Credits and personnel
Credits are adapted from the Dubbel liner notes.

Petter Bergander – electric piano, organ, piano
Eric Broheden – mastering
Joakim Hemming – bass
Ronny Lahti – mixing
Peter Månsson – drums, keyboards, production, programming, recording
Mikko Pavola – guitar
Lena Philipsson – backing vocals, music
Orup – backing vocals, lyrics, music, piano

Charts

Weekly charts

Year-end charts

Certifications

Release history

References

See also
List of number-one singles and albums in Sweden (2008)

2008 songs
2008 singles
Lena Philipsson songs
Orup songs
Songs written by Orup
Swedish-language songs
Roxy Recordings singles
Sony BMG singles
Number-one singles in Sweden